Black chanterelle is a common name of several fungi species and can refer to:

Craterellus cornucopioides
Polyozellus multiplex